The Civil List and Secret Service Money Act 1782 (22 Geo. 3. c. 82) was an Act of the Parliament of Great Britain. The power over the expenditure in the King's household was transferred to the Treasury, and branches of which were regulated. No pension over £300 was to be granted if the total pension list amounted to over £90,000. Thereafter, no pension was to be above £1,300 unless it was granted to members of the royal family or granted by Parliament. Secret service money employed domestically was similarly limited. A section of the act also abolished the existing Council of Trade and Foreign Plantations which, with the loss of the American War of Independence, had been dismissed earlier by King George III on 2 May 1782.

Notes

Great Britain Acts of Parliament 1782